The 11.3×36mmR (commonly referred to as "11mm Montenegrin") is a rimmed carbine and revolver cartridge developed by Austria-Hungary. Though originally designed for the Früwirth repeating carbine, it was also used with the Gasser M1870 revolver. The caliber was widespread throughout the Balkans due to the Montenegrin Pattern Revolvers.

Although this cartridge is no longer manufactured, enthusiasts reproduce them using slightly modified 7.62×54mmR brass cut down to the length of the original; using various types of mostly cast bullets.

See also
11 mm caliber
List of handgun cartridges
Table of handgun and rifle cartridges

References

1867 introductions
Ammunition